Adrienne Staples  (born 1956/1957) is a New Zealand local-body politician. She was the first woman Mayor of South Wairarapa, serving in the role for 12 years between 2004 and 2016.

Personal life 
Staples was born in Featherston, New Zealand. She runs a small manufacturing business based in Featherston and a Wellington IT consulting company.

Career 
Staples was a member of the Featherston community board. She was elected Mayor of South Wairarapa in 2004, becoming the district's first female mayor. After retiring from the mayoralty in 2016 she ran for a position on the Greater Wellington Regional Council, where she was elected deputy-chair.

In 2013 she and other Wairarapa mayors were the subject of a parody video based on the film Downfall. She and her husband threatened to sue the video's creator for defamation, and engaged lawyers to have YouTube remove the video.

Honours

Foreign honours 
  :
  Order of the Rising Sun 2nd Class, Gold Star (2017)

References 

Living people
1957 births
People from Featherston, New Zealand
Mayors of places in the Wellington Region
Wellington regional councillors